AL-Ma'moon University College  (Arabic:كلية المأمون الجامعة),  is an Iraqi Private college  in Baghdad, Iraq. It was founded on 23 April 1990, and it is one of the oldest private universities in Iraq.

External links
 University of Al-Ma'mun

Baghdad
1990 establishments in Iraq
Educational institutions established in 1990